is a city located in Hiroshima Prefecture, Japan. The city was founded on November 3, 1958.

As of 2016, the city has an estimated population of 26,035 and a population density of 220 persons per km2. The total area is 118.30 km2.

Ōkunoshima, the island where a poison gas plant of the Imperial Japanese Army was located, belongs to Takehara.

Occupying a strategic location on the Seto Inland Sea, it became renowned as a port city in the Muromachi period and then flourished as a centre of the salt industry in the latter days of the Edo period. More recently, it has styled itself as "The Little Kyoto of Aki" and the Special Historical District of old warehouses was selected as one of Japan's "100 Most Scenic Towns".

Geography

Climate
Takehara has a humid subtropical climate (Köppen climate classification Cfa) characterized by cool to mild winters and hot, humid summers.

Demographics
Per Japanese census data, the population of Takehara in 2020 is 23,993 people. Takehara has been conducting censuses since 1960.

Tourism

Museums
 Takehara Museum 
 Kaguyahime Bamboo Princess Museum 
 Masayuki Imai (Ceramic Artist) Museum  
 History of Takehara Museum 
 Ozasaya Sake Museum

Mountains and Island
 Mount Asahi (Otake)  
 Mount Kurotaki 
 Ōkunoshima Island

Little Kyoto of Aki Province
 Takehara Historical Heritage 
 Okakae Jizo Statue 
 Chosei-ji Temple  
 Saihō-ji (Takehara) Temple 
 Shoren-ji Temple 
 Kodo Ebisu-do Shrine

Hot spring and Sakura (Cherry Blossom Tree) Park
 Yusaka Onsen-kyo  
 Comprehensive Park Bamboo Joy Highland

Festivals and Running Races
 Miyatoko Children's Festival at Tadanoumi  (April) 
 Nika Village Renge (Lotus) Festival  (April)
 Takehara Take (Bamboo) Festival in the Conserved Townscape  (May)
 Tadanoumi Gion (Purification Ritual) Festival  (July) 
 Takehara Tanabata Festival  (July) 
 Tadanoumi Tenjin Yoichi Summer Festival  (July)
 Takehara Sumiyoshi Shrine Sea Festival  (August)  
 Takehara Summer Festival Fireworks  (August) 
 Fukuda Shishimai Lion Dance (October) 
 Bamboo Candle Light Festival Shokei no Michi  (October) 
 Takehara Ekiden  (October)
 Rabbit Cross Country Short Running Race on Ōkunoshima Island  (November)
 Shinmeisai Fire Festival at Futamado,Tadanoumi  (February)

Transportation

Railways

There are two main lines running through Takehara Station. There is the West Japan Railway Company and the Kure Line.

Sister cities
Takehara has a sister city relationship with Damyang in South Korea.

Notable people

 Shōgo Hamada, singer-songwriter
 Hayato Ikeda, Prime Minister from 1960 - 1964
Naganori Ito, Chief development engineer of Nissan Skyline
 Masataka Taketsuru, founder of Japan's whisky industry

In popular culture
Takehara is the setting for the slice-of-life anime series Tamayura.
Massan - NHK Asadora (morning drama) television series inspired by the life of Taketsuru and his wife Rita

References

External links

Takehara City official website 

Cities in Hiroshima Prefecture
Port settlements in Japan
Populated coastal places in Japan